Cavalier song is a Jacobean and Carolinian genre of song, a later equivalent to Elizabethan lute song. Many of the surviving examples were part of a large scale lavish court entertainment, the  Stuart Masque. The genre is not as widely heard as the lute song, partly due to modern sources for the songs, such as large Musica Britannica volumes being impractical for playing and singing from If playing from the original notation the lute or keyboard player needs to be able to perform from unfigured bass. 
The period has been neglected by musicologists for some years, because when the songs are played through on the piano they lack substance, and their true worth only emerges through a communicative performance. However, some songs such as Henry Lawes's The Lark,
William Lawes' Gather ye Rosebuds, various songs by Thomas Brewer and Nicholas Lanier's The Marigold have found their way into singing anthologies.

Much of this repertoire was recorded and performed by the Consort of Musicke
under Antony Rooley.

Further reading 
 https://web.archive.org/web/20060907102146/http://engphil.astate.edu/EIRC/ is Explorations in Renaissance Culture, a scholarly journal with articles about the texts employed.
 Lawes, Henry (edited  Ian Spink), (2000), Cavalier Songwriter, Oxford University Press.
 Cavalier Songs: 1625-1660, Ian Spink, Musica Britannica Vol. 3.
Sabol, Andrew J. (editor), (1959), Songs and dances from the Stuart Masque. An edition of sixty-three items of music for the English court masque from 1604 to 1641, Brown University Press.
Sabol, Andrew J. (editor), (1982), Four hundred songs and dances from the Stuart Masque, Brown University Press.

16th-century music genres
17th-century music genres
Song forms
17th century in England
16th century in Scotland
17th century in Scotland